Burdick Township is a township in Perkins County, in the U.S. state of South Dakota. Its population was 23 as of the 2010 census.

References

Townships in South Dakota
Townships in Perkins County, South Dakota